Sainte-Sabine-Born is a former commune in the Dordogne department in southwestern France. On 1 January 2016, it was merged into the new commune Beaumontois-en-Périgord.

History
The commune was formed in 1974 from the former communes of Born-de-Champs and Sainte-Sabine.

Population

See also
Communes of the Dordogne department

References

Former communes of Dordogne